A Modest Destiny (abbreviated to AMD) is a pixel art webcomic created by Sean Howard. The comic started in January 2003 and ran until 2010. It consists of four chapters and one side story.

Summary

A Modest Destiny consists of four chapters, also called seasons or arcs – "Maxim Saves the World", "The Dreaded Vampire Lord Fluffy", "The War of Fate", and "Prophecies of the Demon King" – and one short story entitled "Sibling Rivalry". The comic is set in a fantasy world, but Howard allows his characters a modern mentality. Strips can regularly parody fantasy clichés and will on occasion break the fourth wall.

The first arc, "Maxim Saves The World", follows the adventures of the titular character, Maxim, and is narrated through a series of flashbacks. At this point the strip makes liberal use of clichés and one-shot jokes, building a narratives through various sub-plots.

The second arc, "The Dreaded Vampire Lord Fluffy", is roughly half the length of the first and focusses on a single story rather than several smaller ones. Set in the same universe as the first chapter, it follows a vampire necromancer named Fluffy who had been tamed by society. The story also features a number of lesser-used characters from the first storyline and depicts the events leading up to a war between the humans and the undead.

With the third arc, "The War Of Fate", Howard's aim was to create a more detailed and complex storyline. The comic's artistic style also changed for this chapter, Howard creating more realistic backgrounds using Adobe Photoshop instead of the pixel art style backgrounds used in previous chapters. The story is set five years after the end of "Lord Fluffy" in a world all but destroyed by war against the undead. An undead army, led by the mysterious Black Knight, has taken over the majority of the country, with only a small group of humans left to oppose him. These humans, led by Maxim and his friends, defend a small city called Last Hope.

The final arc of A Modest Destiny was titled "Prophecies of the Demon King".

History

Publication 
A Modest Destiny started in January 2003. On December 28, 2003 the first arc ended and Howard announced a new science fiction space opera webcomic entitled The Starship Destiny, unrelated to A Modest Destiny. When this new strip concluded, work resumed on the second chapter of A Modest Destiny. In a January 2004 interview, Howard said that he wanted A Modest Destiny to run for only three years, so that it would never get tired and repeat itself.

The second arc, "The Dreaded Vampire Lord Fluffy", began on March 16, 2004 and ended in September 2004. During this arc, the comic changed format, with larger 12-panel story comics posted Monday through Friday, and short, non-canon strips featuring characters from both A Modest Destiny and The Starship Destiny posted on the weekends.

The third arc, "The War Of Fate", began on January 1, 2005. In July 2005, with the storyline halfway through, Howard announced that he was ceasing to make webcomics, but later restarted. On December 22, 2005, Howard published the original outline for "The War of Fate", including material which never made its way into comics.

On September 29, 2006, the fourth arc, "Prophecies of the Demon King", began, and finished on June 10, 2010.

At the beginning of February 2011, he announced plans for a short fifth arc to bring the story to a conclusion. However, this was never done.

Reception 
Howard claimed in January 2004 that the site received around 12,000 unique visitors per day.

In his 2004 book, How to Draw and Sell Digital Cartoons, Leo Hartas used A Modest Destiny as an illustration of how reusing artwork can be an effective way to save time when creating a comic.

Major characters

Maxim - The main character of the story. The first comic shows him at an old age, sporting an eye patch, bragging about how he saved the world twice.
Gilbert - Maxim's evil twin brother and the main antagonist for the first chapter. He works with Team Evil to resurrect the evil wizard Deo-Deo.
Fluffy - A two-thousand-year-old vampire necromancer who has been domesticated and now works for the humans by creating dungeons for warriors to adventure in. First regularly appeared in "The Dreaded Vampire Lord Fluffy" (though he had a cameo in the last page of season 1).
Hechter - A living suit of armor that was created by the vampire lord Fluffy three hundred years prior to the beginning of A Modest Destiny. Dim-witted but hilarious.
Hubert - A drunkard thief who teams up with Maxim early on to stop Team Evil.
Jenny - The owner of the local inn and bar, she is one of Maxim's major love interests, and becomes his wife between AMD and AMDF.
Maureen - Maxim's other love interest, Maureen is the secretary for the Warriors' Guild. She marries Lucile between AMD and AMDF.
Bart - Also known as Black Bart the Stupidly Courageous, he is the stupid, but adorable, guild master for the Warrior's Guild. Bart is both boss and mentor to Maxim. He reappears in AMDW where Lucile calls him "Black Bart"
Lucile - Grew up with Maxim at the orphanage. During one of her adventures, she was forced to marry Maxim to prevent being turned into a cow by a cursed wedding ring. She later divorces him and marries Maureen so he can marry Jenny.
Ruby - First appearing in AMDF, she is the captain of the guards. She likes violence and sarcasm, in that order.
Gustav - First appears in AMDF (was mentioned by name in season 1). An incredibly unintelligent but remarkably strong warrior with a paralyzing fear of the undead.
Giggles - First appears in "The War of Fate" (though was mentioned by name at the end of season 1). An undead spy for the Black Knight, Giggles is captured by the heroes and becomes romantically involved with Hechter. She masqueraded as Benny.
The Crimson Blade - A superhero who fights for justice and righteousness. It is known that several different people have donned the Crimson Blade name and armor.
Mina - The only named Crimson Blade, first introduced during AMDF. Mina was one of 1,047 Crimson Blades during AMDF, and she became Captain of the Guard during AMDW.
Matilda - Hechter's sister and a vampire. She has a lisp.
Zanzabar - In the second series of AMD, he betrays and kills king Khaan for Matilda, and becomes a vampire. In the third series he is an antagonist.
Sapphire - First appears in AMDC. Ruby's sister, whose visit to Ruby provides the plot of AMDC
Gillian - First appears in "The War of Fate". Maureen's blue-eyed redhead daughter, likely to be the daughter of Gilbert.
Morris - Maureen's brother, who in "The War of Fate" was revealed to have gone utterly insane.  He now appears to be the legitimate Pope, due to a rather odd series of events. In AMD-PDK Morris is shown to slowly regain his mental stability.
Dark Knight -  The main antagonist in AMD-PDK, he is also mentioned in other chapters. He also claims to be Gilbert's Father.

Author 
A Modest Destiny was created by Sean Howard. In an interview, Howard said that his background was in programming. He said that he became interested in comics when a website he followed went down for a server upgrade and the admin posted a list of things people could do instead, one of which was a link to Sluggy Freelance. Some time later, he was seeking work and looking for a way to be creative and started drawing comics. Howard said that his use of pixel art was based on needing art for video games he was producing. Howard felt the term "sprite comic" was inappropriate for his work as his art was original rather than copied out of a video game, and said he could not agree with doing so and that "it has led to some of the worst webcomics in existence."

Sean Howard also produced the comics The Starship Destiny, The Atheist, the Agnostic, and the Asshole, and Zombies of the Living Dead.

Dispute with Penny Arcade 
In late 2003, Howard wrote to the creators of Penny Arcade over the use of his art by users of the Penny Arcade forum. Howard's letter said that he had already "shut down six web comics that were using his art". Mike Krahulik posted about the letter and dispute on the Penny Arcade website, including a link A Modest Destiny; the traffic overload from this temporarily caused a shutdown of Howard's site.

References

Interview with the author by Matthew Sorlien

External links

Russian translation
French translation

2000s webcomics
Fantasy webcomics
Pixel art webcomics
2003 webcomic debuts